Megamania is an Atari 2600 game by Steve Cartwright and published by Activision in 1982. Versions were released for the Atari 5200 and Atari 8-bit family in 1983. Megamania is similar to Sega's 1981 arcade title Astro Blaster.  Both games have nearly identical patterns of approaching enemies with the player relying on an "energy" meter.  The player's ships are remarkably similar in both games.

The game took Cartwright six months to initially develop and another three months to fine-tune.
The band The Tubes performed a Megamania theme song in a 1982 television commercial advertising the Atari 2600 version of the game.

Gameplay

Megamania gameplay resembles that of Astro Blaster, but rather than being aliens or spaceships the enemies are various objects such as hamburgers, bow ties, and steam irons. The object is to shoot them down before the energy bar at the bottom of screen is depleted, all while avoiding the oncoming enemies and their own projectile attacks. Each of the enemies fly in select patterns and as soon as they hit the bottom of the screen, they re-appear at the top until shot by the player. The player's spacecraft depicted in the game is a cross between the U.S.S. Enterprise and Klingon battlecruiser from the Star Trek universe.

Scoring
The first cycle scores 20 to 90 points in 10 point increments each round for each object defeated; after the first cycle, every object destroyed scores 90 points. Once a wave is cleared, the player scores bonus points equal to the value of the object times the number of energy units remaining.

Every 10,000 points gives the player an extra life; the player can have no more than six extra lives in stock at a time.

If a player exceeds a score of 999,999 the game ends.

Patch
Anyone who scored above 45,000 points could send Activision a picture of their screen receive an "Official Megamaniac" emblem.

Ports
Megamania was ported to the Atari 8-bit family and Atari 5200 by Glyn Anderson. The ports add a title screen and more detailed enemies, plus the names of the enemies listed in the manual have changed. There are "ice cream sandwiches" instead of "cookies," "refrigerator magnets" instead of "bugs," and "diamond rings" instead of "diamonds."

Reception
The original Atari 2600 version of Megamania received an award for "Most Humorous Home Arcade Game" at the 4th annual Arkie Awards. Video magazine reviewed the Atari 8-bit version in 1984, describing it "hardly different" in terms of gameplay from the original Atari 2600 version, but emphasizing its "visually enhanced" graphics that allow players "to clearly distinguish what each wave of attacking objects is supposed to represent". Computer and Video Games rated it 80% in 1989.

Reviews
Games

Legacy
The Atari 2600 version is included with Activision Anthology (2002). A visually updated version is part of Arcade Zone for the Wii (2009).

See also

Spider Fighter
Threshold, another game inspired by Astro Blaster
List of Atari 2600 games
List of Activision games: 1980–1999

References

External links
Megamania for the Atari 2600 at Atari Mania

1982 video games
Atari 8-bit family games
Activision games
Atari 2600 games
Atari 5200 games
Fixed shooters
Video games designed by Steve Cartwright
Video games developed in the United States